Vernon is a village in Waukesha County, Wisconsin, United States. The population was 7,474 at the 2020 census. The former unincorporated community of Guthrie and the ghost town of Dodges Corners are in the village.

History

On June 4, 2020, the former Town of Vernon incorporated as a village.<ref name="DOAWis"

Geography
According to the United States Census Bureau, the village has an area of 32.7 square miles (84.7 km2), of which 32.2 square miles (83.5 km2) is land and 0.5 square miles (1.2 km2) is water.

Demographics

As of the census of 2000, there were 7,227 people, 2,380 households, and 2,122 families resided in the town. The population density was 224.1 people per square mile (86.5/km2). There were 2,405 housing units at an average density of 74.6 per square mile (28.8/km2). The racial makeup of the town was 98.39% White, 0.46% African American, 0.21% Native American, 0.25% Asian, 0.06% Pacific Islander, 0.08% from other races, and 0.55% from two or more races. Hispanic or Latino of any race were 1.02% of the population.

There were 2,380 households, out of which 41.4% had children under the age of 18 living with them, 82.9% were married couples living together, 3.9% had a female householder with no husband present, and 10.8% were non-families. 7.7% of all households were made up of individuals, and 2.1% had someone living alone who was 65 years of age or older. The average household size was 3.00 and the average family size was 3.18.

In the town, the population was spread out, with 28.1% under the age of 18, 7.0% from 18 to 24, 26.6% from 25 to 44, 32.7% from 45 to 64, and 5.7% who were 65 years of age or older. The median age was 39 years. For every 100 females, there were 108.3 males. For every 100 females age 18 and over, there were 104.2 males.

The median income for a household in the town was $71,366, and the median income for a family was $73,850. Males had a median income of $50,363 versus $32,103 for females. The per capita income for the town was $26,019. About 0.8% of families and 1.4% of the population were below the poverty line, including 0.2% of those under age 18 and 8.5% of those age 65 or over.

Historic sites
The Reformed Presbyterian Church of Vernon is in the village. Listed on the National Register of Historic Places, it is a Greek Revival structure built in the 1850s.

Notable people
William Allison, Wisconsin state representative, lived in Vernon.
Dave Craig, Wisconsin state representative, resides in Vernon.
Glenn Robert Davis, U.S. representative, was born in Vernon.
James A. McKenzie, Wisconsin state representative, was born in Vernon.
John M. Oddie, Wisconsin state representative, lived in Vernon.
Nick Pearson, Olympics speed skater, was born in Vernon.
Delbert K. Smith, Wisconsin state representative, was born in Vernon.
Tyler Styer, professional pool player, was born in Vernon.

References

External links
Village of Vernon

Villages in Waukesha County, Wisconsin
Villages in Wisconsin